The 1955 Miami Redskins football team was an American football team that represented Miami University in the Mid-American Conference (MAC) during the 1955 college football season. In their fifth and final season under head coach Ara Parseghian, the Redskins compiled a perfect 9–0 record (5–0 against MAC opponents), won the MAC championship, and outscored opponents by a combined total of 226 to 47. The defense allowed only 5.2 points per game, which remains a Miami school record. It was Miami's first undefeated, untied season since 1921.

Dick Mattern was the team captain. The team's statistical leaders included Tirrel Burton with 722 yards, Tom Dimitroff with 579 passing yards, and Presby Bliss with 218 receiving yards. Burton averaged 8.8 yards per carry, which remains a Miami school record. Burton also led the 1955 Miami team in scoring (84 points), pass interceptions (four), and punt returns (14 for 216 yards).

Bo Schembechler was an assistant coach on the team.

Schedule

References

Miami
Miami RedHawks football seasons
Mid-American Conference football champion seasons
College football undefeated seasons
Miami Redskins football